Saturnia pavonia, the small emperor moth, is a moth of the family Saturniidae. It was first described by Carl Linnaeus in his 1758 10th edition of Systema Naturae. Sometimes, the incorrect genus name Pavonia is still used for this species. This moth occurs throughout the Palearctic region and is the only member of its family to be found in the British Isles, where it is usually called simply the emperor moth.

Description

The hindwings are orange with a similar eyespot.

The male flies rapidly during the day from mid-April to late June looking for the rather sluggish females, which usually only fly at night. The species inhabits a range of habitats but is most often associated with heathland and moorland.

The caterpillar is black and orange at first, later becoming green with black rings and yellow and red spots. The commonest food plant is heather but the species has also been recorded feeding on a huge range of other plants (see list below). The species overwinters as a pupa within a fibrous cocoon.

Subspecies
Saturnia pavonia pavonia (southern Spain and possibly Morocco)
Saturnia pavonia josephinae (Schawerda, [1924]) (southern Spain and possibly Morocco)
Saturnia pavonia colombiana (Colombia and possibly Ecuador)

Recorded food plants 
S. pavonia larvae have been recorded feeding on Alchemilla, Alnus, Arbutus, Betula, Calluna, Cornus,  Crataegus, Erica, Fagus, Filipendula, Fragaria, Fraxinus, Hippophae, Humulus, Juglans, Lythrum, Malus, Myrica gale, Pistacia, Populus, Potentilla, Prunus, Pyrus, Quercus, Rhamnus, Rosa, Rubus, Rumex, Salix, Sambucus, Schinus, Sorbus, Spiraea, Ulmus, Vaccinium.

References 

 Chinery, Michael. Collins Guide to the Insects of Britain and Western Europe, 1986 (Reprinted 1991).
 Skinner, Bernard. Colour Identification Guide to Moths of the British Isles, 1984.
 Waring, Paul, Martin Townsend and Richard Lewington. Field Guide to the Moths of Great Britain and Ireland, 2003.

External links

Emperor moth. UKmoths

Lepiforum e.V.

Pavonia
Moths described in 1758
Moths of Europe
Moths of Asia
Taxa named by Carl Linnaeus